World Botanical Gardens and Waterfalls is a commercial botanical gardens with a large waterfall, located between Umauma and Hakalau, at the corner of Leopolino Road and Hawaii Belt Road, State Highway 19, 16 miles north of Hilo, Island of Hawaii, Hawaii. The gardens are open daily with an admission fee.

The Rainforest Walk was the first portion open to public touring on July 4, 1995.

On September 2, 2004, a change of management of World Botanical Gardens took place, and in 2008 the Umauma Falls overlook and its surrounding 90 acres was sold to Umauma Experience. 

In 2009 the garden officially opened a zip-line tour known as Zip Isle Zip Line Adventure descending into the Hanapueo stream gulch.  This was developed by Experience Based Learning. This was to become one of many adventures that would initiate the collection known as Botanical World Adventures. The adventures include World Botanical Gardens, Zip Isle Zip Line and in 2011 the addition or Segway Off-Road Rainforest Adventure.

See also 
 List of botanical gardens in the United States

References

External links 
 Botanical World Adventures
 World Botanical Gardens
 
 Segway Off-Road Adventure
 Umauma Falls

Botanical gardens in Hawaii
Protected areas of Hawaii (island)